Havířov railway station is a train station in Havířov, Czech Republic, located on a line between the cities of Ostrava and Český Těšín. Its main building is one of the best examples of the Czechoslovak avant-garde artistic movement known as the Brussels style of the 1960s.

History
The first train station was opened at this place in 1910. After the city of Havířov was founded after the Second World War it was needed to rebuild the station and to build a new station building. The new building was built in 1964-1969 by the Moravian architect Josef Hrejsemnou in the so-called Brussels style. In the interior there is a huge glass mosaic designed by Czech painter and glass designer Vladimír Kopecký. The owner České dráhy (Czech Railways) plans to reconstruct the station with work projected to begin in 2019, which may include demolishing the station building. Many architects, art historians and others protest against this decision.

Services

References

Railway stations in Moravian-Silesian Region
Buildings and structures in Havířov
Railway stations opened in 1910